Norman Rule (born 28 January 1928) is an Australian former sports shooter. He competed at the 1956, 1960 and the 1964 Summer Olympics.

References

1928 births
Living people
Australian male sport shooters
Olympic shooters of Australia
Shooters at the 1956 Summer Olympics
Shooters at the 1960 Summer Olympics
Shooters at the 1964 Summer Olympics
Sportspeople from Adelaide
20th-century Australian people